Nels Hansen Smith (August 27, 1884July 5, 1976) was an American politician who served as the 18th Governor of Wyoming from 1939 until 1943. He was a Republican.

Biography
He was born on August 27, 1884 in Gayville in the Dakota Territory to Danish immigrants Margaret (née Larsen) and Peter Smith.

Smith moved to Wyoming in 1907 and subsequently was elected to the Wyoming House of Representatives for the Fifteenth State Legislature. He lived in Crook County.

He was elected governor in 1938, defeating incumbent Governor Leslie A. Miller.

In 1942, when it was proposed Japanese-Americans be relocated to Wyoming Governor Smith told  Milton Eisenhower, “If you bring any Japs into my state they will be hanging from every tree.”

He lost the 1942 election to Lester Hunt, a Democrat. In 1942, Smith and two partners bought Ranch A in Crook County, from the estate of Moses Annenberg; it is now listed on the National Register of Historic Places.

He died on July 5, 1976 in Spearfish, South Dakota.

Smith's granddaughter Connie Smith, 10 years old, disappeared in Lakeville, Connecticut (a part of Salisbury, Connecticut) while attending summer camp in 1952. He and his son, Connie's father, exhausted all resources trying to find her, but to no avail. She has never been found.

References

Wyoming State Archives biography. Accessed January 17, 2007

External links 
 

Republican Party governors of Wyoming
American Lutherans
American people of Danish descent
1976 deaths
1884 births
People from Yankton County, South Dakota
People from Crook County, Wyoming
Republican Party members of the Wyoming House of Representatives
20th-century American politicians
20th-century Lutherans